Yevgeniya Olshevskaya (born 7 September 1978) is a Russian diver. She competed in two events at the 2000 Summer Olympics.

References

1978 births
Living people
Russian female divers
Olympic divers of Russia
Divers at the 2000 Summer Olympics
Place of birth missing (living people)